About a Mile marks the first album from About a Mile. Word Records released the album on July 15, 2014. About a Mile worked with Howard Benson and Ian Eskelin on the production of this album.

Reception

Signaling in a three star review by CCM Magazine, Matt Conner remarks, "About A Mile might be a band making their full-length debut, but their self-titled LP sounds as seasoned as any veteran release this year... A bit color-by-numbers, but it’s a pretty picture nonetheless." Tony Cummings, in a nine out of ten review from Cross Rhythms, explaining, "'About A Mile' will seem predictable and generic to the hipsters but to less blinkered Christian radio listeners simply looking for spiritual uplift with well crafted, well performed songs, this will do very nicely" Specifying in a four star review at New Release Tuesday, Kevin Davis discerns, "This is a great collection of confessional and authentic expressions of faith. The songs are poignant and powerful... If you want to experience an uplifting, soul-stirring and worshipful album, look no further than About A Mile." In rating the album three and a half stars Alex "Tincan" Caldwell from Jesus Freak Hideout, referencing, "Passion is a funny thing; it covers a multitude of musical shortcomings in the same way abundant sunshine can turn even the most mundane days better."

Track listing

Charts

References

2014 albums
Word Records albums